Joel Persson (born 4 March 1994) is a Swedish professional ice hockey defenceman who plays under contract for the Växjö Lakers of the Swedish Hockey League (SHL).

Playing career
Persson previously played with his hometown club, Kristianstads IK. Following the 2016–17 season in the Hockeyettan  where Persson scored 40 points in 38 games, he was signed by the Växjö Lakers of the Swedish Hockey League (SHL) to a three-year contract on 27 April 2017.

In the 2017–18 season, Persson made his debut in the top tier SHL appearing in 51 games for Växjö. He posted 28 assists for 34 points in the regular season before also contributing with five points in 13 playoff games, helping Växjö capture the Le Mat Trophy.

On 18 May 2018, Persson was signed to a one-year contract by the Edmonton Oilers of the National Hockey League (NHL). The Oilers immediately announced that Persson would be loaned back to the Växjö Lakers for the 2018–19 season.

Persson made his NHL debut with the Oilers on 5 October 2019 in a 6–5 win over the Los Angeles Kings. On 8 November, he recorded his first career points (two assists) in a 4–0 win over the New Jersey Devils. Persson also skated in 27 games for the Oilers' American Hockey League (AHL) affiliate, the Bakersfield Condors.

On 24 February 2020, Persson was traded to the Anaheim Ducks in exchange for Angus Redmond and a 2022 conditional seventh-round pick. He was assigned directly to AHL affiliate, the San Diego Gulls, featuring in 7 games before the remainder of the season was cancelled due to COVID-19.

On 6 June 2020, Persson as a restricted free agent from the Ducks, signed a three-year contract to return Sweden with former club, Växjö Lakers of the SHL. His NHL rights' were later relinquished by the Anaheim Ducks.

Career statistics

Awards and honours

References

External links

1994 births
Living people
Bakersfield Condors players
Edmonton Oilers players
People from Kristianstad Municipality
San Diego Gulls (AHL) players
Swedish ice hockey defencemen
Undrafted National Hockey League players
Växjö Lakers players
Sportspeople from Skåne County